Mario Lusiani (4 May 1903 – 3 September 1964) was an Italian cyclist. He won the gold medal in Men's team pursuit at the 1928 Summer Olympics along with Giacomo Gaioni, Cesare Facciani and Luigi Tasselli.

References

1903 births
1964 deaths
Cyclists at the 1928 Summer Olympics
Olympic cyclists of Italy
Olympic gold medalists for Italy
Italian male cyclists
Olympic medalists in cycling
Cyclists from the Province of Padua
Medalists at the 1928 Summer Olympics
Italian track cyclists
20th-century Italian people